Barclay Square is a public square and park in the city of Tartu, Estonia, adjacent to the Ülikooli street. It is named after Russian Imperial officer Michael Andreas Barclay de Tolly and there is a large monument in the park honoring him.

Buildings and structures in Tartu
Parks in Estonia
University of Tartu
Squares in Estonia
Tourist attractions in Tartu